Form 13F is a quarterly report filed, per United States Securities and Exchange Commission regulations, by "institutional investment managers" with control over $100M in assets to the SEC, listing all equity assets under management.

Form 13F provides position-level disclosure of all institutional investment managers with more than $100m in assets under management with relevant long US holdings. All US-listed equity securities (including ETFs) in the manager’s portfolio are included and detailed according to the number of shares, the ticker, the issuer name, etc. The full list of securities currently covered by form 13F includes more than 17,500 securities. Form 13F covers institutional investment managers, which include Registered Investment Advisers (RIAs), banks, insurance companies, hedge funds, trust companies, pension funds, mutual funds,  For example, an investment adviser that manages private accounts, mutual fund assets, or pension plan assets is an institutional investment manager.

Short positions are not required to be disclosed on Form 13F, nor subtracted from long positions that are reported. In 2015, the New York Stock Exchange and the National Investor Relations Institute submitted a petition to the SEC supporting a requirement for disclosure of short positions on Form 13F.

Form 13F is required to be filed within 45 days of the end of a calendar quarter, or if that day falls on a Saturday, Sunday or holiday, the deadline is the next business day. So, for example, for positions held as of the end of December, Form 13F must be filed by February 14 (if it is not a Saturday, Sunday, or holiday).

Both the Chartered Alternative Investment Analyst (CAIA) designation and the CFA Institute make special mention of 13F-based analysis for due diligence and monitoring of investment managers, as well as investment-idea-generation. Absent access to privileged access to manager holdings, Form 13F provides a baseline level of data with which to analyze investment manager exposures, performance attribution, and associated risks.

See also 
Schedule 13D
Schedule 13G
Schedule TO

References

SEC filings
Asset lists
Accounting in the United States